Taenaris macrops, the silky owl, is a butterfly of the family Nymphalidae. The species was first described by Cajetan Felder and Rudolf Felder in 1860.

Subspecies
Taenaris macrops macrop (Bachan, Halmahera, Morotai)
Taenaris macrops macropina (Fruhstorfer, 1904) (Obi)
Taenaris macrops ternatana Fruhstorfer, 1909 (Ternate)

Description
Wings are whitish, with dark brown edges. Upperside of each hindwing has one large ocellated spot, while undersides of each hinding show two large bright eyespots, of which the centre is blackish with a small white central eye, broadly surrounded with yellowish.

Distribution
This species can be found in the northern Maluku Islands.

References

External links

Taenaris
Butterflies described in 1860
Taxa named by Baron Cajetan von Felder
Taxa named by Rudolf Felder
Butterflies of Indonesia